Devils Den Lake is a small lake located on Vancouver Island four kilometres west of Port Alberni, British Columbia.

References

Alberni Valley
Lakes of Vancouver Island
Alberni Land District